United Progressive Party may refer to:

United Progressive Party (Antigua and Barbuda)
United Progressive Party (Saint Vincent and the Grenadines)
United Progressive Party (Barbados)
United Progressive Party (Ghana)
United Progressive Party (Samoa), former Samoan party 
United Progressive Party (Zambia)
United Progressive Party, a party in New Zealand that was reconstituted as the Christian Democrat Party
Unified Progressive Party (South Korea)